The 1977 Toledo Rockets football team was an American football team that represented the University of Toledo in the Mid-American Conference (MAC) during the 1977 NCAA Division I football season. In their first season under head coach Chuck Stobart, the Rockets compiled a 2–9 record (2–7 against MAC opponents), finished in ninth place in the MAC, and were outscored by all opponents by a combined total of 287 to 112.

The team's statistical leaders included Jeff Hepinstall with 359 passing yards, Mike Alston with 772 rushing yards, and Frank Jarm with 204 receiving yards.

Schedule

References

Toledo
Toledo Rockets football seasons
Toledo Rockets football